NBA ShootOut (Total NBA in Europe) is a series of basketball video games based on the NBA and released for the PlayStation and PlayStation 2. It was one of Sony's first-party sports franchises for the PlayStation, along with NHL FaceOff, NFL GameDay, NCAA GameBreaker and ESPN Extreme Games. The first two entries, released in 1996 and 1997, were developed by Sony Computer Entertainment's British in-house development team. Later entries were developed by 989 Sports, including NBA ShootOut 2000, the only game in the series to be released for Microsoft Windows. 

In the games, players can choose an existing NBA franchise and play exhibition or regular season games, as well as create their own players to include in regular season team rosters. Charles Barkley, Shaquille O'Neal and Michael Jordan were represented in the game with other names (Forward, Center and Guard respectively).

NBA ShootOut 99 for the PlayStation was cancelled by 989 Sports due to its level of quality.

Games

Reception
The first two games were well received, with the Official UK PlayStation Magazine awarding 9/10 and a Starplayer award to both. They praised the motion capture and the playability.

See also
ESPN NBA Hangtime '95, Sony's predecessor for Sega CD

References

National Basketball Association video games
Sony Interactive Entertainment franchises
Video game franchises introduced in 1996